Rose Creek is a  long 2nd order tributary to the Haw River, in Guilford and Rockingham County, North Carolina.

Course
Rose Creek rises in Apple Pond located in Guilford County on the divide between Rose Creek and Reedy Fork.  Rose Creek then flows northeast into Rockingham County to meet the Haw River about 1 mile southwest of Williamsburg, North Carolina.

Watershed
Rose Creek drains  of area, receives about 46.2 in/year of precipitation, and has a topographic wetness index of 406.57 and is about 39% forested.

Natural history
The Rockingham County Natural Heritage Inventory recognized one location in the Rose Creek watershed, Williamsburg Alluvial Forest.  Williamsburg Alluvial Forest is a county significant site that contains examples of Piedmont Alluvial Forest and Mesic Mixed Hardwood Forest.

See also
List of rivers of North Carolina

Additional images

References

Rivers of North Carolina
Rivers of Guilford County, North Carolina
Rivers of Rockingham County, North Carolina